Jayant Savarkar (born May 3, 1936) is an actor who works in Marathi and Hindi theater, television, and films.

He was awarded the Natvarya Prabhakar Panshikar Lifetime Achievement Award by the Government of Maharashtra in the field of theater.

Web series 
Jayant Sawarkar is known for his role as an astrologer in the Marathi language web series Samantar which also features Swapnil Joshi in lead role. The series was released in 2020.

References

External links 
 Jayant Savarkar on Book My Show

1936 births
Living people
Indian male television actors
Indian male film actors
Marathi actors
Indian male stage actors